Grace Carlyle (July 24, 1877 – September 20, 1953) was an American stage and film actress.

Selected filmography
 The Eagle's Wings (1916)
 An International Marriage (1916)
 The Place Beyond the Winds (1916)
 Please Help Emily (1917)
 Bringing Up Betty (1919)
 Held to Answer (1923)
 Trimmed in Scarlet (1923)
 The Fast Set (1924)
 By Divine Right (1924)
 Wine (1924)
 Shameful Behavior? (1926)
 The Notorious Lady (1927)
 Lonesome Ladies (1927)
 She's My Baby (1927)
 Uncle Tom's Cabin (1927)

References

Bibliography
 Dietz, Dan . The Complete Book of 1920s Broadway Musicals. Rowman & Littlefield, 2019.
 Munden, Kenneth White. The American Film Institute Catalog of Motion Pictures Produced in the United States, Part 1. University of California Press, 1997.

External links

1877 births
1953 deaths
American film actresses
American silent film actresses
American stage actresses
20th-century American actresses
People from Perrysburg, Ohio